Ulmus macrocarpa var. macrocarpa L. K. Fu is found on hillslopes and in valleys at elevations of 700–800 m in the Chinese provinces of Anhui, Gansu, Hebei, Heilongjang, Henan, Hubei, Jiangsu, Jilin, Liaoning, Nei Mongol, eastern Qinghai,  Shaanxi, Shanxi, Shandong. Beyond China it is also found in Korea, Mongolia, and Russia (Siberia).

Fu sank Ulmus taihangshanensis S.Y.Wang as a synonym for this variety, but U. taihangshanensis, as described from Henan, differs in having more pubescent twigs which never develop corky wings, and thinner leaves (papery rather than leathery).   . U. taihangshanensis has more recently been sunk as a synonym of Ulmus lamellosa.

Description
The tree is distinguished by a "leaf blade abaxially sparsely pubescent, adaxially hirsute or with convex trichome scars, base attenauted to rounded, apex shortly caudate. Samara pubescent, apically concave or rounded, wings thick, stigmas pubescent. Fl. Mar., fr., Apr."

Pests and diseases
No information available.

Cultivation
The tree is very rare in cultivation beyond Asia.

Accessions
Europe
Grange Farm Arboretum, Lincolnshire, UK. Grafted tree acquired 2013, acc. no. not known.

References

macrocarpa var. macrocarpa
Flora of China
Trees of China
Trees of Korea
Flora of Korea
Trees of Siberia
Flora of Siberia
Trees of Russia
Flora of Russia
Trees of Mongolia
Flora of Mongolia
Trees of Asia
Ulmus articles missing images
Elm species and varieties